

League table

The regular season started 27 October 2010 and ended 19 February 2011.

Standings as of 22 February 2011

Teams 1–8 qualifies to the playoffs, teams 9–10 qualifies to next season's Elitserien, teams 11–12 plays the second placed teams of each Allsvenskan to qualify to next season and teams 13–14 are relegated to Allsvenskan

Knock-out stage

The quarter and semi finals started 22 February and ended 10 March. The final was played 20 March 2011.

Final

Relegation play-offs

Qualification to the 2011–2012 season was played between 1 and 5 March 2011.

Season statistics

Top scorers

References

Elitserien (bandy) seasons
Bandy
Bandy
Elitserien
Elitserien